Lordstown is a village in southern Trumbull County, Ohio, United States. The population was 3,332 at the 2020 census. It is part of the Youngstown–Warren metropolitan area. 

Lordstown is best known as the home of the Lordstown Assembly, a General Motors automotive plant that produced compact cars from 1966 until 2019. After the closure of Youngstown's steel factories, the Lordstown Assembly became the largest industrial employer of the Mahoning Valley region. The factory is currently owned by Foxconn for the production of Lordstown Motors vehicles. GM and LG Chem have built a 30 GWh EV battery factory in the town, Ultium Cells LLC, which is scheduled to begin production in August 2022. The village is also home to a TJX HomeGoods distribution center, as well as several smaller manufacturers.

History

Lordstown Township, which nearly completely incorporated as the village of Lordstown in 1975 (except for a small section which was then annexed to Warren Township), was one of the original survey townships of the Connecticut Western Reserve as Town 3, Range 4. The township, and subsequently the village, was named for Alec C. Lord, who laid out the township.

Geography
Lordstown is at  (41.171785, -80.866655). It borders or touches the following other townships and municipalities:
Jackson Township, Mahoning County, on the south;
Milton Township, Mahoning County, on the southwest (touches, but does not border);
Newton Township, on the west;
Braceville Township, on the northwest (touches, but does not border);
Warren Township, on the north;
Weathersfield Township, on the east;
Austintown Township, Mahoning County, on the southeast (touches, but does not border);

Demographics

2010 census
As of the census of 2010, there were 3,417 people, 1,391 households, and 1,025 families living in the village. The racial makeup of the village was 95.1% White, 3.2% African American, 0.1% Native American, 0.4% Asian, 0.1% from other races, and 1.1% from two or more races. Hispanic or Latino of any race were 0.9% of the population.

There were 1,391 households, of which 29.5% had children under the age of 18 living with them, 58.0% were married couples living together, 10.2% had a female householder with no husband present, 5.5% had a male householder with no wife present, and 26.3% were non-families. 22.1% of all households were made up of individuals, and 9.9% had someone living alone who was 65 years of age or older. The average household size was 2.46 and the average family size was 2.86.

The median age in the village was 45 years. 21.1% of residents were under the age of 18; 6.3% were between the ages of 18 and 24; 22.7% were from 25 to 44; 32.7% were from 45 to 64; and 17.2% were 65 years of age or older. The gender makeup of the village was 48.6% male and 51.4% female.

2000 census
As of the census of 2000, there were 3,633 people, 1,412 households, and 1,077 families living in the village. The population density was 157.0 people per square mile (60.6/km). There were 1,483 housing units at an average density of 64.1 per square mile (24.8/km). The racial makeup of the village was 95.84% White, 2.89% African American, 0.08% Native American, 0.36% Asian, 0.11% from other races, and 0.72% from two or more races. Hispanic or Latino of any race were 0.44% of the population.

There were 1,412 households, out of which 32.2% had children under the age of 18 living with them, 63.7% were married couples living together, 9.0% had a female householder with no husband present, and 23.7% were non-families. 21.1% of all households were made up of individuals, and 7.6% had someone living alone who was 65 years of age or older. The average household size was 2.57 and the average family size was 2.97.

In the village, the population was spread out, with 24.0% under the age of 18, 7.1% from 18 to 24, 27.9% from 25 to 44, 30.0% from 45 to 64, and 11.0% who were 65 years of age or older. The median age was 40 years. For every 100 females there were 97.7 males. For every 100 females age 18 and over, there were 97.8 males.

The median income for a household in the village was $51,144, and the median income for a family was $55,305. Males had a median income of $45,082 versus $28,063 for females. The per capita income for the village was $22,683. About 5.6% of families and 4.4% of the population were below the poverty line, including 6.7% of those under age 18 and 6.4% of those age 65 or over.

Education
Lordstown Local School District operates one elementary school and Lordstown High School.

Lordstown has a public library, a branch of the Warren-Trumbull County Public Library.

References

External links
Village website

Villages in Trumbull County, Ohio
Villages in Ohio
1975 establishments in Ohio